Hamilton Island Yacht Club was established in 2009 by Bob Oatley. It is situated at Hamilton Island (Queensland) in Australia and provides services for recreational sailors.

References

External links

Yacht clubs in Queensland
2009 establishments in Australia
Sports clubs established in 2009
Whitsunday Islands